The Central American Defense Council was an alliance of Central American countries (El Salvador, Costa Rica, Guatemala, Honduras, Nicaragua, and Panama). It was created by a treaty signed on December 14, 1963 in Guatemala City Closely linked to SOUTHCOM, for the common purpose of quelling the various left-wing guerrilla movements that threatened stability in the region during the Cold War. Costa Rica, which had no standing armed forces, participated as a member.  It is now defunct.

References

Central America
Treaties of Costa Rica
Treaties of El Salvador
Treaties of Guatemala
Treaties of Honduras
Treaties of Nicaragua
Treaties of Panama
Cold War treaties